Madi TV, sometimes called Madi TV Africa, is a Congolese Swahili-language pay television owned and operated by Madi Pictures, a digital entertainment company based in Democratic Republic of the Congo. The channel, launched in 2020 and headquartered in Goma, broadcast in Swahili language a mix of entertainment programs and purchased movies and TV shows.

Background

History 
Madi TV was co-created by Christophe Madihano and his twin brother Christian Madihano in 2020. On September 30, 2021, Canal+ in the Democratic Republic of the Congo launched a new service plan, which added the Madi TV and Maboke TV channels to its ACESS format, Digital terrestrial television , EasyTV.

Madi TV broadcasts from its headquarters in Goma, a city located in the eastern Democratic Republic of Congo's province North Kivu, to 38 African countries via Canal+ Afrique and to the whole world via Canal+ Overseas.

Branding 
The logo shows traditional art handicraft and the large mammals of the African Great Lakes region, surrounded by the letter "M" (initial of the name of the channel and its parent company Madi Pictures) in a green background followed, aesthetically at the bottom, the full name of the television channel.

Slogan 

 Since September 30, 2021 : Burudani Milele!.

Personalities

Founders 

 Christophe Madihano
 Christian Madihano

References

External links 

 Official site

Swahili-language television networks
Television channels and stations established in 2020
Television stations in the Democratic Republic of the Congo